The Enoch Fuller House is an historic octagon house located at 72 Pine Street in Stoneham, Massachusetts.  The two story wood-frame house was built c. 1850 for Enoch Fuller, a friend of P. T. Barnum, and is topped by a low pitch roof with a central cupola.  There is a single story porch that wraps around the entire building.  The porch is supported by chamfered posts decorated with drop pendant brackets, and has a cut baluster rail.  The roof lines of the porch, main roof, and cupola, are all studded with paired brackets.

On April 13, 1984, it was added to the National Register of Historic Places.

See also
List of octagon houses
William Bryant Octagon House, also in Stoneham
National Register of Historic Places listings in Stoneham, Massachusetts
National Register of Historic Places listings in Middlesex County, Massachusetts

References

Houses on the National Register of Historic Places in Stoneham, Massachusetts
Houses in Stoneham, Massachusetts
Octagon houses in Massachusetts